Khvoshabad (also Romanized as Khvoshābād, Khowshābād, and Khushābād; also known as Khosh Abad) is a village in Khorram Dasht Rural District, in the Central District of Famenin County, Hamadan Province, Iran. At the 2006 census, its population was 655, in 153 families.

References 

Populated places in Famenin County